Love Swings is an album of standards by American singer Bobby Darin, released in 1961. It remained on the charts for only ten weeks and peaked at number 92.

Reception

In his Allmusic review, critic JT Griffith called the album "one of the most unheralded and under appreciated Bobby Darin albums" and is Darin's "most interesting conceptual approach to an album. The sequence of songs takes the listener on an emotional journey from love's first stirrings and its delirious heights to the first disillusionments and melancholy lows. Love Swings plays like two separate albums. While both sides are cohesive thematically, it is hard to listen to the sweet swinging sounds of side one and then eagerly flip to the more haunting and moody songs on side two. This is one of Bobby Darin's most sophisticated albums"

Track listing
"Long Ago (and Far Away)" (Ira Gershwin, Jerome Kern) – 1:49
"I Didn't Know What Time It Was" (Richard Rodgers, Lorenz Hart) – 2:18
"How About You?" (Ralph Freed, Burton Lane) – 2:03
"The More I See You" (Mack Gordon, Harry Warren) – 1:44
"It Had to Be You" (Isham Jones, Gus Kahn) – 2:13
"No Greater Love" (Jones, Marty Symes) – 3:23
"In Love in Vain" (Kern, Leo Robin) – 3:07
"Just Friends" (John Klenner, Sam M. Lewis) – 2:13
"Something to Remember You By" (Howard Dietz, Arthur Schwartz) – 3:01
"Skylark" (Hoagy Carmichael, Johnny Mercer) – 2:42	
"Spring Is Here" (Rodgers, Hart) – 2:47	
"I Guess I'll Have to Change My Plan" (Dietz, Schwartz) – 2:10

Personnel
Bobby Darin – vocals
Richard Behrke – piano
Al Hendrickson – guitar
Joe Mondragon – bass guitar
Larry Bunker, Ronnie Zito – drums
Torrie Zito – arranger, conductor

References

1961 albums
Bobby Darin albums
Atco Records albums
Albums produced by Ahmet Ertegun